Unfabulous is an American teen sitcom that aired on Nickelodeon. The series is about an "unfabulous" middle schooler named Addie Singer, played by Emma Roberts. The show, which premiered on September 12, 2004, was one of the most-watched programs in the U.S. among children between the ages of 10 and 16. It was created by Sue Rose, who previously created two animated series Pepper Ann (for Disney) and Angela Anaconda, and co-created the character Fido Dido with Joanna Ferrone. The series ended on December 16, 2007, with the final episode titled "The Best Trip Ever".

Most of the episodes are narrated by Addie, and are told in flashbacks. The show's theme song is performed by Jill Sobule, who also wrote the songs performed throughout the show.

Overview
Unfabulouss main character is a teenage girl named Addie Singer (Emma Roberts), who writes songs about her life in middle school. Her best friends are Geena Fabiano (Malese Jow), who is interested in fashion and designs her own clothes, and the environmentally committed school basketball player Zack Carter-Schwartz (Jordan Calloway). They all attend Rocky Road Middle School in an unspecified East Coast city. However, in episode 34 "The Birthday" when Addie receives a letter from when she was 7 years old the address is listed as "Pinecrest, PA". Addie's older brother Ben (Tadhg Kelly) works at Juice!, a smoothie bar where Addie and her friends often hang out after school.

Throughout the first season, Addie obsesses about her crush on Jake Behari (Raja Fenske), who already has a girlfriend.

For the majority of the second season, however, Addie is dating Randy Klein (Evan Palmer). They break up towards the end of the season and Addie realizes that she still likes Jake. The made-for-TV movie Unfabulous: The Perfect Moment focused on Addie and Jake getting together although Jake will be gone for the rest of the summer in Canada.

In the third season, Addie and Jake finally begin dating and Geena and Zack begin to have feelings for each other.

Episodes

Cast

Main
 Emma Roberts as the 13-year-old main character Addie Singer.
 Malese Jow as Geena Fabiano, Addie's best friend who is interested in fashion and designs her own clothes, which are usually provocative and therefore she receives daily lectures from the school principal.
 Jordan Calloway as Zack Carter-Schwartz, Addie's other best friend who is on the basketball team and an environmental advocate that wears sandals
 Tadhg Kelly as Ben Singer, Addie's older brother
 Molly Hagan as Mrs. Sue Singer, Addie's mother
 Markus Flanagan as Mr. Jeff Singer, Addie's father
 Emma Degerstedt as Maris Bingham, a mean girl.
 Chelsea Tavares as Cranberry St. Claire, Maris' best friend.

Recurring
 Dustin Ingram as Duane Oglivy
 Mary Lou as Mary Ferry
 Raja Fenske as Jake Behari
 Bianca Collins as Patti Perez. Another mean girl who joins Maris & Cranberry and ex-girlfriend of Jake who tries to make Addie jealous & humiliate her.
 Sarah Hester as Jen Stevenson-Ben's girlfriend and co-worker at Juice!
 Harry Perry III as Manager Mike
 Stephen Ford as Chad 
 Mildred Dumas as Principal Brandywine
 Evan Palmer as Randy Klein
 Sean Whalen as Coach Pearson
 Brandon Smith as Mario (season 1)
 Miracle Vincent as Ellie
 Shawn McGill as Freddy
 Carter Jenkins as Eli Pataki (season 1)
 Shanica Knowles as Vanessa
 Lourdes Pantin as Becca

Other appearances
The show's main character, Addie Singer, also appears in a cross-over episode of Drake & Josh called "Honor Council", in which she helps Megan play a prank on Josh for a video Megan makes for her website. The episode aired in November 2004, a few months after both series had debuted.

Broadcast
The series aired on Nickelodeon and premiered in the United States on September 12, 2004. The final episode aired on December 16, 2007. After the series ended, reruns aired on TeenNick until 2015.

Unfabulous has also previously aired on Nickelodeon Canada and Nickelodeon Teen in France. As of 2021, the show is not available on Paramount+ or other streaming services.

Home media
TEENick Picks, Volume 1 released on April 18, 2006 – features "The Little Sister" (Season 1, Episode 11)

Awards and nominations

Merchandise
Along with the start of the second season in September 2005, Nickelodeon also began selling different types of Unfabulous-related merchandise, beginning with the album Unfabulous and More (see Soundtrack below). In November 2005, the album was followed by two books tying into the show, Keepin' It Real and Split Ends, both written by Robin Wasserman, and the first items in a line of clothes based on Addie's wardrobe on the show. Four more books were released in February 2006, Starstruck, Jinxed!, Meltdown and Just Deal. The last book released in 2007 was based on the two-part episode, The Perfect Moment, by Samantha Margies. The books are narrated by Addie herself in her own words depicting each storyline.

Before the launch of the third season, a video game based on the show was released for the Game Boy Advance by THQ on September 25, 2006.

All episodes from the first and the second season (including The Perfect Moment) were available for download in the iTunes Store in the U.S. since fall 2006, but are now not available anymore. They have since been put back for download as of 2012.

Soundtrack

On September 27, 2005, shortly after the premiere of the show's second season, Columbia Records and Nick Records released the album Unfabulous and More, which serves as both the show's soundtrack and as Emma Roberts' debut album.

The album includes several original songs (among them "Dummy" and "I Wanna Be", both of which were also released as music videos, "I Have Arrived", and "This Is Me", which was co-written by Roberts), as well as some of Addie's songs from the first season (however in newly recorded versions), including "Punch Rocker" and "New Shoes" (both from the episode "The Party"), "94 Weeks (Metal Mouth Freak)" (from "The Bar Mitzvah") and "Mexican Wrestler" (which had previously appeared on Jill Sobule's 2000 album Pink Pearl and in the Unfabulous episode "The 66th Day").

The album peaked at #46 on Billboard's Heatseekers Albums.

Notes

References

External links
 
 

2000s American single-camera sitcoms
2000s American teen sitcoms
2004 American television series debuts
2007 American television series endings
2000s Nickelodeon original programming
English-language television shows
Television series created by Sue Rose
Middle school television series
YTV (Canadian TV channel) original programming
Television shows adapted into video games
Television shows set in Pennsylvania
Television series about teenagers